Shunji Yanai (born 15 January, 1937 in Tokio) is a Japanese politician who served as ambassador to the United States from 1999 until 2001.

Yanai entered the Ministry of Foreign Affairs in 1961, and studied at the University of Strasbourg while in France. He was director of the Treaties Bureau during 1991.

He served as Vice Minister of Foreign Affairs from 1997 until 1999. He then became ambassador to the United States, and served in the position until 2001. He was removed from his post due to a scandal involving bureaucrats in the Foreign Ministry.

In 2005, he became a judge in the International Tribunal for the Law of the Sea (ITLS). On 1 October 2011, he was elected to succeed José Luís Jesus as President of the ITLS for a three-year term. 

As part of its strategy of not recognizing the Philippines v. China case, China accused him of manipulating the tribunal's composition.

He headed an advisory panel on Japanese self-defence during both of Shinzō Abe's terms as prime minister. The panel consisted of thirteen security experts, and was concerned with amendments to Article 9 of the Japanese Constitution.

References

Ambassadors of Japan to the United States
Japanese judges of United Nations courts and tribunals
Foreign ministers of Japan
Living people
1937 births